Mr. Beef  is an Italian beef restaurant located in River North, Chicago, United States.

Information 

The restaurant is owned by Joe Zucchero and originally started out as a stand in 1979. The restaurant features  Italian beef sandwiches, hamburgers, hot dogs, french fries and pizza puffs. The restaurant was said to be suffering from financial issues in 2009, but was able to make it through the situation.

The restaurant is most notable for being the inspiration and the storefront for the television series, The Bear, which is about an Italian beef restaurant in Chicago. Christopher Storer, the producer of the show, cites Joe Zucchero as a friend. The television series more than doubled business at the store, as they went from selling 300 sandwiches a day to over 800. 
The owner of Mr. Beef, Joe Zucchero, passed away in March 2023, though the restaurant will stay open.

In popular culture 

Along with being featured on The Bear, the restaurant was featured on Food Wars, The Tonight Show with Jay Leno and The Tonight Show Starring Jimmy Fallon.

References

Chicago
Restaurants in the United States
Cuisine of Chicago
Restaurants in Chicago